The NLEX Road Warriors first participated in the Philippine Basketball Association (PBA) Draft on August 24, 2014, two month before their first PBA season. The Road Warriors bought the franchise of the Air21 Express in 2014. NLEX received the rights for all of the Air21's players and its previous draft pick transactions.

Matt Ganuelas-Rosser became the team's first draft choice, the 4th pick in the 2014 PBA Draft.

Selections

Notes
1.All players entering the draft are Filipinos until proven otherwise.

References

Philippine Basketball Association draft